Michael P. Gibbons is a Judge of the Nevada Court of Appeals, currently serving as chief judge.

Education and career
Gibbons received his undergraduate degree from the University of California at Los Angeles and his J.D. from University of Idaho College of Law in 1980. After law school, Gibbons clerked for judge Howard D. McKibben. Gibbons then served as a chief deputy district attorney for Douglas County. 
In 1994, Gibbons was elected to the Ninth Judicial District Court. He was reelected four consecutive times.

In December 2014, he was appointed to the newly created Court of Appeals. In March 2019, Gibbons replaced judge Abbi Silver as chief judge.

Gibbons is the brother of justice Mark Gibbons, currently serving on the Nevada Supreme Court.

References

External links
Michael P. Gibbons

21st-century American judges
Nevada lawyers
Nevada state court judges
Year of birth missing (living people)
Living people